The Minnesota Fillies were an American women's professional basketball team based in Minnesota that competed in the Women's Professional Basketball League from 1978 to 1981. The Fillies were one of three teams to play in all three of the league's seasons. The Met Center served as the team's home court during their first two seasons. In the team's last season, they played home games at the Minneapolis Auditorium.

The Women's Professional Basketball League disbanded in 1981 due to financial problems. Most of these problems were attributed to owners defaulting on creditors and outstanding payroll entitlements to players and other employees. In 1981, Commissioner Sherwin Fischer promised that the Minnesota Fillies players would receive their entitlements. When the Commissioner failed to deliver on this promise, the Fillies walked off the court in Chicago ten minutes before a scheduled game against the Chicago Hustle. Despite a full house at De Paul Alumni Hall, the game was forfeited. The Fillies finished out the final games of the 1980–1981 season with replacement players.

Season-by-season records

|-
|colspan="6" align=center  | Minnesota Fillies
|-
|1978-79 || 17 || 17 || .500 || ||
|-
|1979-80 || 22 || 12 || .647 || Won quarterfinals Lost semi-finals ||2–1 New Orleans1–2 Iowa
|-
|1980-81 || 7 || 28 || .200 || ||
|-
|Totals ||46 || 57 || .447 || ||
|-
|Playoffs || 3 || 3 || .500 || ||

Personnel

Julia Yeater was hired to coach the Fillies in 1978. She had been the head coach of the women's basketball team at Western Kentucky University for two seasons, with a record of 45 wins and 17 losses. Yeater reflected that she joined the team because she wanted to see more female head coaches in the newly established WBL. Yeater received her master's degree from University of Kansas.

Women also played in the Semi Pro League sponsored by Steve and Dave Winfield,  professional baseball players. These women included Janelle D. Gibson, who was studying at Minneapolis Community College at the time, and Kathy Burks, a 19-year-old attending the University of Minnesota.

The president and general manager of the team was J. Gordon Nevers.

References 

Basketball teams established in 1978
Sports in Minneapolis
Basketball teams in Minnesota
1978 establishments in Minnesota
1981 disestablishments in Minnesota
Women's Professional Basketball League teams
Sports clubs disestablished in 1981
Women's sports in Minnesota